AIK had a sensational season, winning 14 league matches by the odd goal, to claim their first domestic title since 1998, also winning the cup final against IFK Göteborg, also title rivals in the league, which was decided in a straight run-in between the two candidates. There, AIK turned around a 1–0 deficit to win 2–1 and claim the title, more than enough, considering a draw had landed the title as well. Key players in the title success included goalkeeper Daniel Örlund, conceding just 20 goals all season, plus new defensive general Jos Hooiveld, midfielder Jorge Ortiz and striker Iván Obolo, all of them departing following the title success.

Season events
After injuries to both Tomi Maanoja and Nicklas Bergh, AIK announced the loan signing of Milos Petkovic from Vasalund until 30 June.

On 14 June, AIK announced the return of Dulee Johnson on a two-and-a-half year contract from Maccabi Tel Aviv.

On 24 July, AIK announced the loan signing of Niklas Backman from Väsby United for the remainder of the season.

On 1 August, AIK announced the signing of Antônio Flávio from Santo André.

Squad

Transfers

In

Loans in

Out

Loans out

Released

Trial

Friendlies

Competitions

Overview

Allsvenskan

League table

Results summary

Results by matchday

Results

Svenska Cupen

Final

Squad statistics

Appearances and goals

|-
|colspan="14"|Players away on loan:

|-
|colspan="14"|Players who appeared for AIK but left during the season:

|}

Goal scorers

Clean sheets

Disciplinary record

References

AIK Fotboll seasons
AIK
Swedish football championship-winning seasons